Microtis cupularis, commonly known as the cupped mignonette orchid sometimes as Hydrorchis cupularis, is a species of orchid endemic to the south-west of Western Australia. It has a single thin, hollow, onion-like leaf and up to thirty small, yellowish-green and red flowers. The plants often grow in shallow water and are self-pollinating.

Description 
The petals are a similar size to the lateral sepals and are partly enclosed by the labellum. Flowering occurs from September to December.

Taxonomy and naming
The cupped mignonette orchid was first formally described in 2005 by D.L.Jones and Garry Brockman from a specimen collected near Bull Creek and given the name Hydrorchis cupularis. The description was published in The Orchadian. In 2007, Andrew Brown changed the name to Microtis cupularis. The specific epithet (cupularis) is derived from the Latin word cupula meaning "cup", referring to the cup-shaped labellum.

Distribution and habitat
Microtis cupularis grows in seasonally wet depressions and where water runs of granite outcrops, often growing in several centimetres of water. It is found between Perth and to just east of Esperance.

Conservation
Microtis cupularis is classified as "not threatened" by the Western Australian Government Department of Parks and Wildlife.

References

External links
 

cupularis
Endemic orchids of Australia
Orchids of Western Australia
Plants described in 2005